Luhrasp, was ruler of the Afrasiyab dynasty in ca. 1475. He was the son and successor of Kiya Husayn I. Not much more is known about him; he was later succeeded by his grandson Kiya Husayn II at an unknown date.

Sources 
 

15th-century monarchs in the Middle East
15th-century Iranian people
15th-century deaths
Year of birth missing
Afrasiyab dynasty
Iranian slave owners